Ahmed Zeeshan (born 26 October 1979) is a Pakistani first-class cricketer who played for Karachi cricket team.

References

External links
 

1979 births
Living people
Pakistani cricketers
Karachi cricketers
Cricketers from Karachi